Steamboat  Creek drains Washoe Lake, flowing north to northeast through Truckee Meadows and finally intersecting the Truckee River, east of Reno, Nevada. Historical documents indicate that in the early 1860s there were at least six mills reducing Comstock ore in Washoe Valley and during  these earliest days of the Comstock  mining.

Steamboat Springs near Galena also drains into Steamboat Creek which was the location of Castle Peak mine. Mercury can be found in tributaries of Steamboat Creek as a result of mining during the 1860s. Due to the difficulty of trans-porting both ore down from Virginia City and timber up the  steep grade to Virginia City from Washoe City during the mid 1800s, especially in winter, the sites of extensive milling  began to change and Carson City and the Carson River were sources for hauling ore down and lumber up to Virginia City during the mid-1860s

In the late 1800s, mills in the Washoe Lake area, Nevada, used mercury (Hg) to remove gold and silver from the ores of the Comstock deposit. Since that time, mercury has been found in Washoe Lake, down Steamboat Creek, and to the Truckee River. The creek continues to be a source of mercury to the Truckee River.

Studies have been conducted to determine concentrations of total and methylmercury (MeHg) in surface sediments in the Steamboat Creek watershed. Mercury concentrations measured in channel and bank sediments did not decrease downstream, indicating that mercury contamination has been distributed along the creek's length. Steamboat Creek flows past the newly built Reno Fire House and into the tributary of what is now Marsh Lands of Damonte Ranch Development. Both pond/wetland and channel sites exhibited making up Steamboat Creek show high potential for mercury.

References

 Distribution of total and methylmercury in sediments along Steamboat Creek (Nevada, USA) Jelena Stamenkovica, Mae S Gustina, Mark C Marvin-DiPasqualeb, Beth A Thomasa, Jennifer L Ageeb Department of Environmental and Resource Sciences, MS 370, University of Nevada, Reno, NV, US Geological Survey, Water Resources Division, MS 480, 345 Middlefield Rd, Menlo Park, CA  Received 8 June 2003, Accepted 31 October 2003, Available online 9 April 2004

Bodies of water of Washoe County, Nevada
Mercury poisoning
Rivers of Nevada